Collision Earth is a  Canadian disaster television film directed by Paul Ziller.  It was released in 2011 for broadcast on the Syfy Channel and later distributed by Anchor Bay Entertainment on Blu-ray.

Plot
In the year 2029, the Nautilus spacecraft is getting prepared to land on the planet Mercury. On board is Commander Marshall Donnington, Pilot Lee Tahon, and Flight Cruiser Victoria Preston. However, during their orbit capture, a sudden and unpredicted solar flare erupts from the sun and hits Mercury and starts to magnetize and tear the planet apart. The Nautilus manages to escape danger at the beginning of the event but then is caught in it when the engines fail. Mercury then starts to fall apart but stays together because of the magnetism and is pushed out of its orbit, starting on a collision course with Earth.

An instant later, in a university auditorium, scientist James Preston explains how unpredictable the asteroids, solar flares, and comets are. He then describes a planetary defense system called Project Seven. After the lecture, a person from mission ops with the Nautilus explains that they have lost contact with the craft. Preston quickly runs home and tries to contact mission ops, but is unsuccessful. He then contacts Jennifer Kelly, a scientist working at a facility called Sphere. While on the phone, Preston gets command codes for Project Seven just before the power goes out in his house. Later, a magnetic wave passes Earth, damaging several satellites and moving anything metal.

Meanwhile, the Nautilus is shown drifting in space with low oxygen levels and damaged navigation and communication systems. Marshall and Victoria both survived the event, but Lee did not. They find him with severe burns and is not breathing. Meanwhile, at Sphere, they find out that Mercury will miss Earth by a distance of 500,000 miles. Back on the Nautilus, the oxygen levels are fixed and Marshall stabilizes the ship. They then start working on fixing the navigation and communication systems. Back on Earth, Preston arrives at his friend's observatory and explains to him that something is not right. Victoria manages to fix the communication and somehow connects to a pirate radio station owned by two seniors at North Bay University in Oregon. The Nautilus manages to connect to Christopher Weaver and Brooke Adamson. But they later lose the signal. Preston's friend Matthew Keyes explains to Preston that the sun became a magnetar for one millisecond. Unexpectedly, magnetized pieces of Mercury start entering the atmosphere. After the meteor shower, Preston retrieves a meteor and concludes that it is magnetized.

Later, Brooke and Christopher regain contact with the Nautilus and want them to go to mission ops but it is Houston, so they go to Sphere south of Seattle. When the guards at Sphere don't believe Christopher and Brooke, Victoria sends them to Preston's house in Pacific Grove. Preston arrives at Sphere and manages to get in even though he is not authorized. He tells his old boss Edward Rex to recalculate the planet's trajectory. They then deduce that Mercury is on a collision course with Earth with impact in 18 hours. Rex decides to go with "Operation Recourse" instead of Project Seven. But while they talk, Preston manages to sneak his security badge off of him. When Christopher and Brooke arrive at Preston's house, he is not home, so they go in through his back door and accidentally turn on his computer and look at the Project Seven calculations as Preston walks in. They tell him that his wife sent them and proves it by turning on his radio and he manages to talk to Victoria. When she thinks of magnetism, she thinks of a slingshot maneuver to break free and go back to Earth. But then they lose contact again.

When Preston gets on his computer, he realizes that the Project Seven guidance system is damaged. Matthew comes up with a plan that the Nautilus can tug Project Seven in between the planets. Preston then goes to a fallback facility where the top secret files are located. While on his way to the fallback facility, his car gets stolen so he walks for a while and then gets picked up by Brooke and Christopher. Meanwhile, Victoria manages to pull off the slingshot maneuver, but as a result, the life support system is damaged; Victoria manages to fix it in under fifteen minutes. Meanwhile, not listening to Preston's science, Rex launches the missiles toward Mercury, but they explode before they get to the planet due to Mercury's mangnetism  forcing the missiles to go off course. When Brooke and Christoper's car breaks down because of the alternator, they decide to walk. While Victoria is headed back to Earth, Preston asks her to tether Project Seven to in front of Mercury to deflect it. They then steal a police officer's car but get into an accident along the way, severely injuring Brooke. Since she is not breathing, they leave her behind and some time later they find Jennifer dead and so take her badge to access the fallback facility.

When they get to the facility they find a computer and send activation codes for the energy field to Project Seven thus enabling the energy field. Victoria docks with Project Seven and guides it to Mercury and undocks with it before impact. Preston and Christopher then run outside and see Mercury moving away from Earth. They then contact Victoria, who managed to escape and they tell each other about their prospective views. A scene from outside of the Nautilus, shows asteroid debris from Mercury that had formed into rings around Earth.

Cast
 Kirk Acevedo as James Preston
 Diane Farr as Victoria Preston
 Chad Krowchuk as Christopher Weaver
 Jessica Parker Kennedy as Brooke Adamson
 Adam Greydon Reid as Matthew Keyes
 Andrew Arlie as Edward Rex
 David Lewis as Marshall Donnington
 Catherine Lough Haggquist as Jennifer Kelly

Critical reception

The film was criticized for overused plot elements and low-budget special effects.

See also

Mercury in fiction
List of Canadian films
List of Canadian films of 2011

References

External links
 

Canadian disaster films
2011 television films
2011 films
CineTel Films films
Canadian television films
Disaster television films
English-language Canadian films
Films about astronauts
Fiction set on Mercury (planet)
Films directed by Paul Ziller
2010s English-language films
2010s Canadian films